Emma Kailikapuolono Metcalf Beckley Nakuina (March 5, 1847 – April 27, 1929) was an early Hawaiian female judge, curator and cultural writer. Descended from an American sugar planter and a Hawaiian high chiefess, she was educated in Hawaii and California. She served as curator of the Hawaiian National Museum from 1882 to 1887 and as Commissioner of Private Ways and Water Rights from 1892 to 1907. In her role as a government commissioner, she is often regarded as Hawaii's first female judge. During the early 1900s, she became a supporter of the women's suffrage movement in the Territory of Hawaii. Nakuina was also a prolific writer on the topic of Hawaiian culture and folklore and her many literary works include Hawaii, Its People, Their Legends (1904).

Early life and family 
Nakuina was born March 5, 1847, at her family's homestead in Kauaʻala in the Manoa Valley, at what is now the campus of the University of Hawaii at Manoa. Her father Theophilus Metcalf, originally from Ontario County, New York, arrived in Hawaii on May 19, 1842, and was naturalized as a citizen on March 9, 1846. He worked as a sugar planter and government land surveyor during the Great Mahele. Her mother, Kailikapuolono, was a descendant of the aliʻi lineages of Oahu, which was traditionally associated with the Kūkaniloko Birthstones, where the highest-ranking chiefs of the islands were once born. Her maternal great-grandfather was Nahili, a chief from the island of Hawaii and one of the generals of King Kamehameha I during his conquest of the Hawaiian Islands. Her maternal family was considered to be of the Hawaiian kaukau aliʻi class, or lower ranking chiefs in service to the royal family.

Nakuina was educated at Sacred Hearts Academy and Punahou School in Honolulu. She was also privately tutored in many languages by her father including Greek, Latin, Hebrew, French, German, English, and Hawaiian. In 1866, she was preparing to attend the Young Ladies Seminary (modern day Mills College) in Benicia, California. No records exist of her attendance in the Mills College archives. Her father died on August 6, 1866 while visiting Oakland, possibly in order to settle her into her new school, and she decided to stay in Hawaii instead. At a young age, King Kamehameha IV ordered her to be trained in traditional water rights and customs.

On December 3, 1867, she married Frederick William Beckley Sr. (1845–1881), a part-Hawaiian noble like herself. She served as the lady-in-waiting of Queen Kapiʻolani, the wife of King Kalākaua, while her husband served as the Chamberlain of the Royal Household and in the Hawaiian government as a member of the House of Representatives and as the Royal Governor of Kauai. They had seven children, including son Frederick William Beckley Jr. (1874–1943) and daughter Sabina Beckley Hutchinson (1868–1935). Beckley Sr. died in 1881, leaving Nakuina a widow. In 1887, she remarried to the Reverend Moses Kuaea Nakuina (1867–1911). A nephew of Minister of Finance Moses Kuaea, he was twenty years her junior and also a descendant of Hawaiian nobility. They had two children: a short-lived son named Irving Metcalf Nakuina, who was born and died in 1888, and a daughter who contracted leprosy and was sent to the Kalaupapa Leprosy Settlement.

A newspaper article in the October 16, 1916 issue of the Honolulu Star-Bulletin claimed Emma was godmother to Princess Kaʻiulani, the niece of Kalākaua and last heir to the Hawaiian throne.

Career 
After her first husband's death, Walter Murray Gibson, possibly at the suggestion of King Kalākaua, appointed Nakuina as the female curator of the Hawaiian National Museum and Government Library. She used the title curatrix in official documents. The salary from this governmental post helped her support her children. During her tenure as the governmental curatrix, Nakuina helped expand the collection of the museum, which was located on the upper floor of Aliiolani Hale, the governmental building, and also established herself as an authority on traditional Hawaiian legends and history with a number of publications. She assisted the writers Thomas G. Thrum and William DeWitt Alexander in many of their works, serving as a cultural advisor and translator. After the downfall of the Gibson administration in 1887, funding to the museum was cut and the collections were later incorporated into the Bishop Museum.

In 1892, she was appointed Commissioner of Private Ways and Water Rights for the district of Kona, on the island of Oahu, corresponding to the capital city of Honolulu and its surrounding areas. Nakuina was chosen for this post specifically because of her knowledge of traditional water rights, and she was tasked with the duties of resolving water usage and rights issues. She held this position from 1892 to 1907, at which point the powers were reassigned to the circuit courts. During her tenure, she worked under the monarchy until the 1893 overthrow of the Kingdom of Hawaii. In order to remain in her governmental post, she took the oath of allegiance to the subsequent regimes of the Provisional Government, the Republic and the Territory of Hawaii. Although she never held the formal title, she is often regarded as Hawaii's first female judge.

In March 1893, she became a member of Hui Aloha ʻĀina o Na Wahine (Hawaiian Women's Patriotic League) or Hui Aloha ʻĀina for Women. This patriotic group was founded shortly after its male counterpart the Hui Aloha ʻĀina for Men to oppose the overthrow and plans to annex the islands to the United States and to support the deposed queen. Nakuina served as interpreter of the organization for a month until a dispute arose between two factions of the group. The rift centered on the wordings to a memorial seeking the restoration of the monarchy to be presented to the United States Commissioner James Henderson Blount who was sent by President Grover Cleveland to investigate the overthrow. The original memorial used the word “Queen” leaving out Liliʻuokalani’s name and was opposed by the small faction consisting of elderly, full-blood Hawaiian women who suspected that it was a ploy by the younger, educated part-Hawaiians to put either Kapiʻolani or Kaʻiulani on the throne instead. A second memorial was drafted including Liliʻuokalani’s name and the original architects of the first memorial including Nakuina either resigned or were replaced. Nakuina was replaced by Mary Ann Kaulalani Parker Stillman.

In 1895, Nakuina helped founded the Hawaiian Relief Society in her office to assist the victims of a cholera epidemic in the islands. She co-founded the organization with other leading Hawaiian women including Elizabeth Kekaʻaniau, Abigail Kuaihelani Campbell and Emilie Widemann Macfarlane, who had all been members of Hui Aloha ʻĀina for Women.

In 1897, Nakuina was mentioned in an article by Janet Jennings, of the Chicago Times-Herald, about the important role and status of part-Hawaiian women in the Hawaiian nation, which described her as "a clever and accomplished woman, whose scholarly attainments make her a unique figure in political and social circles of Honolulu."

Later life 
In later life, Nakuina returned to writing. She became one of the first female members of the Hawaiian Historical Society and joined the civic organization Daughters of Hawaii. In 1904, she wrote her only book, Hawaii, Its People, Their Legends, published by the Hawaiian Promotion Committee. It was meant to introduce tourists to the culture of Hawaii, but was also imbued with her own sense of pride for her Hawaiian heritage and bitterness at the negative effects of foreign influence in the islands. According to Cristina Bacchilega, this publication was a covert example of feminine defiance against the Western world.

In 1917, Nakuina hosted a party for Almira Hollander Pitman, a leading suffragist from the mainland United States, and her husband Banjamin Franklin Pitman. The gathering attracted many upper-class Honolulu suffragists including Wilhelmine Widemann Dowsett, president of the National Women's Equal Suffrage Association of Hawaii, and Emma Ahuena Taylor, who asked Almira Pitman to espouse the cause of the women of the Territory of Hawaii. This meeting and subsequent meetings with the Honolulu Women's Club prompted Almira Pitman to write to her connections back home, which helped push a bill through Congress authorizing the Hawaii Territorial Legislature with the power to legislate on the issue of women's suffrage. A local bill was planned in 1919 to enfranchise the women of Hawaii. It was superseded before it could be adopted when, in the following year, Congress passed the Nineteenth Amendment, granting all women in the United States the right to vote.

Nakuina died on April 27, 1929, in her son's house, at the age of eighty-two. She was buried at the Oahu Cemetery with her second husband, Moses Nakuina. In 2017, Hawaiʻi Magazine listed Nakuina among the most influential women in Hawaiian history.

Publications and works 
List below are the known works of Emma Kaili Metcalf Beckley Nakuina in chronological order:

See also 
 List of first women lawyers and judges in Hawaii

References

Bibliography

External links 
 
 

1847 births
1929 deaths
American women writers
Hawaiian ladies-in-waiting
Hawaiian nobility
Hawaiian Kingdom politicians
Native Hawaiian politicians
Native Hawaiian women in politics
Native Hawaiian writers
People from Honolulu
Punahou School alumni
Republic of Hawaii politicians
Women judges
American women curators
American curators
Writers from Hawaii
Hawaii suffragists